Sikunang is a village in Kejajar district, Wonosobo Regency in Central Java province, Indonesia. Its population is 2114.

Climate
Sikunang has a subtropical highland climate (Cwb) with heavy to very heavy rainfall from October to May and moderate to little rainfall from June to September.

References

 Populated places in Central Java